Gary Winston Lineker  (born 30 November 1960) is an English former professional footballer and current sports broadcaster. His media career began with the BBC, where he has presented the flagship football programme Match of the Day since the late 1990s, the longest tenure of any MOTD presenter. Lineker is also the BBC's lead presenter for live football matches, including coverage of international tournaments such as the FIFA World Cup. He has also worked for Al Jazeera Sports, Eredivisie Live, NBC Sports Network, and BT Sport's coverage of the UEFA Champions League.

Lineker began his football career at Leicester City in 1978, and finished as the First Division's joint top goalscorer in 1984–85. He then moved to league champions Everton where he won both the PFA Players' Player of the Year and FWA Footballer of the Year awards in his debut season, before moving to Spanish giants Barcelona. With Barcelona, he won the 1987–88 Copa del Rey and the 1989 European Cup Winners' Cup. He joined Tottenham Hotspur in 1989, and won his second FWA Footballer of the Year and won the FA Cup, his first and only major trophy in English football. Lineker's final club was Nagoya Grampus Eight; he retired in 1994 after two seasons at the Japanese side.

Lineker made his England debut in 1984, earning 80 caps and scoring 48 goals over an eight-year international career. He is England's fourth-highest scorer, behind Harry Kane, Wayne Rooney and Bobby Charlton, and his international goals-to-games ratio remains one of the best for the country. His six goals in the 1986 FIFA World Cup made him the tournament's top scorer, receiving the Golden Boot. Lineker was again integral to England's progress to the semi-finals of the 1990 World Cup, scoring another four goals. He still holds England's record for goals in the FIFA World Cup.

Lineker is also the only player to have been the top scorer in England with three clubs: Leicester City, Everton and Tottenham Hotspur. Notably, he never received a yellow or red card during his 16-year career. As a result, he was honoured in 1990 with the FIFA Fair Play Award. In a senior career which spanned 16 years and 654 competitive games, Lineker scored a total of 331 goals, including 283 goals at club level. After his retirement from football he was inducted into the English Football Hall of Fame. A keen supporter of Leicester City, he led a consortium in 2002 that invested in his old club, saving it from bankruptcy, and was appointed honorary vice-president.

Early life
Gary Winston Lineker was born on 30 November 1960 in Leicester, the son of Margaret P. (Abbs) and Barry Lineker. He was given his middle name in honour of Winston Churchill, with whom he shares a birthday. He has one brother, Wayne, who is two years his junior. Lineker grew up with his family in the city, playing football with Wayne. Their father was a greengrocer, as were their grandfather William and great-grandfather George, in Leicester. Barry Lineker ran Lineker's fruit and veg stall in Leicester Market, and as a child and a young player Gary regularly helped out on the stall. Lineker, who is white, received racial abuse as a child for his dark features.

Lineker first attended Caldecote Road School (Caldecote Juniors), Braunstone in Leicester (east of the Meridian Centre). He then went to the City of Leicester Boys' Grammar School (now City of Leicester College) on Downing Drive in Evington, owing to his preference for football rather than rugby, which was the main sport of most schools near his home. Lineker was equally talented at both football and cricket. From the ages of 11 to 16 he captained the Leicestershire Schools cricket team, and had felt that he had a higher chance of succeeding at it rather than football. He later stated on They Think It's All Over that as a teenager he idolised former England captain David Gower, who was playing for Leicestershire at the time. During his youth he played for Aylestone Park Youth, later becoming the club's president.

Lineker left school with four O Levels. One of his teachers wrote on his report card that he "concentrates too much on football" and that he would "never make a living at that". He then joined the youth academy at Leicester City in 1976.

Club career

Leicester City
Lineker began his career at his hometown club Leicester City after leaving school in 1977, turning professional in the 1978–79 season and making his senior debut on New Year's Day 1979 in a 2–0 win at Filbert Street over Oldham Athletic in the Second Division. He earned a Second Division title medal a year later with 19 appearances, but played just nine league games in 1980–81 as Leicester went straight back down.

However, he became a regular player in 1981–82, scoring 19 goals in all competitions that season. Although Leicester missed out on promotion, they reached the semi-finals of the FA Cup, and clinched promotion a year later as Lineker scored 26 times in the Second Division. In 1983–84, he enjoyed regular First Division action for the first time and was the division's second-highest scorer with 22 goals, although Leicester failed to finish anywhere near the top of the league. He was the First Division's joint top scorer in 1984–85 with 24 goals, and was enjoying a prolific partnership with Alan Smith. However, by this stage he was attracting the attention of bigger clubs, and a move from Filbert Street was looking certain.

Everton
In the 1985 close season, defending league champions Everton signed Lineker for £800,000; he scored 40 goals in 57 games for his new team in the 1985–86 season. Lineker's first game for Everton happened to be away to Leicester City; at half time, he walked into the Leicester dressing room by mistake. He was again the First Division's leading goal scorer, this time with 30 goals (including three hat-tricks), and helped Everton finish second in the league. While at Everton, they reached the FA Cup final for the third consecutive year but lost 3–1 to Liverpool, despite Lineker giving them an early lead when he outpaced Alan Hansen to score. Liverpool had also pipped Everton to the title by just two points. "I was only on Merseyside a short time, nine or 10 months in total really, but it was still a happy time personally, while professionally it was one of the most successful periods of my career", he says. "I still have an affinity towards Everton."

Lineker scored three hat-tricks for Everton; at home to Birmingham City in a 4–1 league win on 31 August 1985, at home to Manchester City in a 4–0 home win on 11 February 1986, and then in the penultimate league game of the season on 3 May 1986, when they kept their title hopes alive with a 6–1 home win over Southampton. On his final league appearance, he scored twice in a 3–1 home win over West Ham United whose own title hopes had just disappeared. However, he and his colleagues were denied title glory as Liverpool also won their final league game of the season at Chelsea.
Lineker has consistently stated since retiring from football that this Everton team was the best club side he ever played in.

Barcelona
After winning the Golden Boot at the 1986 World Cup in Mexico, Lineker was signed by Barcelona for £2.8 million. Barcelona were being managed by former Queens Park Rangers manager Terry Venables, who had also brought in Manchester United and Wales striker Mark Hughes. Barcelona gave Lineker his first chance of European football, as Leicester had never qualified for Europe while he played for them, and Everton were denied a place in the European Cup for 1985–86 due to the ban on English clubs in European competitions following the Heysel disaster.

Lineker made his Barcelona debut against Racing Santander, scoring twice. His Golden Boot-winning performance at the finals generated much anticipation of success at the Camp Nou, and he did not disappoint, scoring 21 goals in 41 games during his first season, including a hat-trick in a 3–2 win over archrivals Real Madrid. Barcelona went on to win the Copa del Rey in 1988 and the European Cup Winners' Cup in 1989. Lineker played in Barcelona's shock home and away defeats to Dundee United. Barcelona manager Johan Cruyff decided to play Lineker on the right of the midfield and he was eventually no longer an automatic choice in the team.

With 42 goals in 103 La Liga appearances, Lineker became the highest scoring British player in the competition's history, but was later surpassed by Gareth Bale in March 2016.

Tottenham Hotspur
Manchester United manager Alex Ferguson attempted to sign Lineker to partner his ex-Barcelona teammate Mark Hughes in attack, but Lineker instead signed for Tottenham Hotspur in July 1989 for £1.1 million. Over three seasons, he scored 67 goals in 105 league games and won the FA Cup while playing for the club. He finished as top scorer in the First Division in the 1989–90 season, scoring 24 goals as Spurs finished third.

He finally collected an English trophy when he won the 1991 FA Cup Final with Spurs, who beat Nottingham Forest 2–1. This was despite Lineker having a goal controversially disallowed for offside and also having a penalty saved by goalkeeper Mark Crossley. Lineker had contributed to Tottenham's run to the final. In the semi-final he scored twice in a 3–1 win over North London rivals Arsenal.

He was the top division's second-highest goalscorer in 1991–92 with 28 goals from 35 games, behind Ian Wright, who scored 29 times in 42 games. Despite Lineker's personal performance, Tottenham finished this final pre-Premier League season in 15th place. His last goal in English football came on the last day of the season in a 3–1 defeat to Manchester United at Old Trafford.

Nagoya Grampus Eight
In November 1991, Lineker accepted an offer of a two-year contract from J1 League club Nagoya Grampus Eight. The transfer fee paid to Tottenham Hotspur was £2 million. He officially joined Nagoya Grampus Eight after playing his final game for Spurs on 2 May 1992, when he scored the consolation goal in a 3–1 defeat by Manchester United on the last day of the season. Shortly before accepting the offer from Nagoya Grampus Eight, Tottenham had rejected an offer from ambitious Second Division club Blackburn Rovers, who had recently been taken over by steel baron Jack Walker.

Having scored 9 goals in 23 appearances over two injury impacted seasons for Nagoya Grampus Eight, he announced his retirement from playing in September 1994. The English national media had previously reported that he would be returning to England to complete his playing career at Middlesbrough or Southampton.

International career
Lineker was capped once by the England B national team, playing in a 2–0 home win over New Zealand's B team on 13 November 1984. He first played for the full England team against Scotland in 1984. He played five games in the 1986 World Cup and was top scorer of the tournament with six goals, winning the Golden Boot, making him the first English player to have done so. He scored the second quickest hat-trick ever at a FIFA World Cup tournament against Poland, the second English player to score a hat-trick at a World Cup, and scored two goals against Paraguay in the second round. He played most of the tournament wearing a lightweight cast on his forearm. He scored for England in the World Cup quarter-final against Argentina, but the game ended in defeat as Diego Maradona scored twice for the opposition (the first goal being the "Hand of God" handball, and the second being the "Goal of the Century"). In 1988, Lineker played in Euro 88, but failed to score as England lost all three Group games. It was later established that he had been suffering from hepatitis.

In the 1990 World Cup, he scored four goals to help England reach the semi-finals. He was unwell during the tournament, and accidentally defecated in his shorts during the opening group game against the Republic of Ireland. After Andreas Brehme sent England 1–0 down in the semi-final, Lineker received a pass from Paul Parker and escaped two West German defenders on his way to scoring the equaliser, but the West Germans triumphed in the penalty shoot-out and went on to win the trophy. Later he said: "Football is a simple game; 22 men chase a ball for 90 minutes and at the end, the Germans win." Lineker's equaliser appears in the popular England national team anthem, "Three Lions", with the lyric "When Lineker scored".

He retired from international football with eighty caps and forty-eight goals, one fewer goal than Sir Bobby Charlton's England record (which Charlton accrued over 106 caps). In what proved to be his last England match, against Sweden at Euro 92, he was substituted by England coach Graham Taylor in favour of Arsenal striker Alan Smith, ultimately denying him the chance to equal—or even better—Charlton's record. He had earlier missed a penalty that would have brought him level, in a pre-tournament friendly against Brazil. He was visibly upset at the decision, not looking at Taylor as he took the bench.

He scored four goals in an England match on two occasions and is one of very few players never to have been given a yellow card or a red card in any type of game.

Media career

Sports reporting 
Following retirement from professional football, Lineker developed a career in the media, initially on the BBC for Radio 5 Live and as a football pundit. He appeared as a team captain on the sports game show They Think It's All Over from 1995 to 2003. He also presented Grandstand in the London studio while then-presenter Desmond Lynam was in Aintree when the Grand National was abandoned because of a bomb alert at the racecourse in 1997. In 1999, he replaced Lynam as the BBC's anchorman for football coverage, including its flagship football television programme Match of the Day, becoming BBC Sport's highest paid presenter. Following the departure of Steve Rider from the BBC in 2005, Lineker, who is a keen recreational golfer with a handicap of four, became the new presenter for the corporation's golf coverage. Despite receiving some criticism from his peers, he continued to front the BBC's coverage of the Masters and The Open.

In 2005, Lineker was sued for defamation by Australian footballer Harry Kewell over comments Lineker had made writing in his column in The Sunday Telegraph about Kewell's transfer from Leeds United to Liverpool. However, the jury was unable to reach a verdict. It became known during the case that the article had actually been ghost-written by a journalist at The Sunday Telegraph following a telephone interview with Lineker.

In May 2010, Lineker resigned from his role as columnist for The Mail on Sunday in protest over the sting operation against Lord Triesman that reportedly jeopardised England's bid to host the 2018 World Cup. Triesman resigned as chairman of the bid and the FA on 16 May 2010 after the publication of a secret recording of a conversation between the peer and a former ministerial aide, during which he claimed that Spain and Russia were planning to bribe referees at the World Cup in South Africa.
Lineker then began working as an anchor for the English language football coverage for Al Jazeera Sport, which is broadcast throughout most of the Middle East. He left the Qatar-based network in 2012.

In 2013, Lineker began working for NBCSN as part of their Premier League coverage and contributing to the US version of Match of the Day. On 9 June 2015, Lineker was unveiled as the lead presenter of BT Sport's Champions League coverage. On 13 August 2016, Lineker presented the first Match of the Day of the 2016–17 season wearing only boxer shorts. Believing it would simply not happen, he had promised in a tweet from December 2015 that if Leicester City won the Premier League, he would "present Match of the Day in just my undies".

As of July 2022, Lineker is the highest-paid BBC presenter and has been for several years; receiving payments of £1.75–1.76 million each year between 2016 and 2020, and approximately £1.35 million in 2020-21. His pay has been criticised by Julian Knight, chair of the parliamentary Digital, Culture, Media and Sport Committee, and Dame Esther Rantzen. The BBC's Director General, Tim Davie, stated that Lineker's pay was justified "because of the value of analysis to the viewing audience".

In March 2023, Lineker was required to step back from presenting on the BBC for three days due to a controversy over his pronouncements on party political matters on social media outlets.

Walkers commercials 
Lineker has appeared in television commercials for the Leicester-based snack company Walkers. Originally signing a £200,000 deal in 1994, his first advert was 1995's "Welcome Home" (Lineker had recently returned to England having played in Japan). Walkers temporarily named their salt and vinegar crisps after Lineker, labelling them 'Salt & Lineker', in the late 1990s. In 2000, Lineker's Walkers commercials were ranked ninth in Channel 4's poll of "The 100 Greatest TV Ads".

Other media appearances 
Lineker participated in Prince Edward's charity television special The Grand Knockout Tournament in 1987. He also appeared in the 1991 play An Evening with Gary Lineker by Arthur Smith and Chris England, which was adapted for television in 1994. He presented a six-part TV series for the BBC in 1998 (directed by Lloyd Stanton) called Golden Boots, with other football celebrities. It was an extensive history of the World Cup focusing on the 'Golden Boots' (top scorers).

In 2006, Lineker took on an acting role as the voice of Underground Ernie on the BBC's children's channel, CBeebies. In December 2008, Lineker appeared on the ITV1 television programme Who Wants to Be a Millionaire? where he and English rugby union player Austin Healey won £50,000 for the Nicholls Spinal Injury Foundation. In 2009, Lineker and his wife Danielle hosted a series of the BBC's Northern Exposure, following on from Laurence Llewelyn-Bowen from the previous year in visiting and showcasing locations throughout Northern Ireland.

Lineker has made a number of cameo appearances in TV shows and movies, such as the 2002 film Bend It Like Beckham, the 2014 BBC TV film Marvellous, and a number of appearances in the Apple TV+ football comedy TV series Ted Lasso. In 2013, Lineker participated in the genealogical programme Who Do You Think You Are? during which he discovered an ancestor who was a poacher, and another who was a legal clerk.

Goalhanger Films
In May 2014, Lineker established his own production company Goalhanger Films Ltd. with former ITV Controller Tony Pastor. During the 2014 FIFA World Cup, Lineker presented several short videos produced by Goalhanger Films on YouTube with the title Blahzil.

In May 2015, the company produced a 60-minute-long documentary presented by Lineker titled Gary Lineker on the Road to FA Cup Glory for the BBC.

Personal life

Lineker married Michelle Cockayne in 1986. In May 2006, Cockayne filed for divorce on the grounds of her husband's alleged "unreasonable behaviour", with documents submitted to the court claiming that Lineker's actions in their marriage had caused her "stress and anxiety". Lineker and she have four sons; George, Harry, Tobias and Angus. The couple subsequently stated that the situation was amicable.

In November 1991, George, Lineker's eldest son, survived a rare form of leukaemia whilst he was a baby, and was treated at Great Ormond Street Hospital in London. Lineker now supports children's cancer charity CLIC Sargent and has appeared in promotional clips encouraging people to give blood. Lineker has been actively involved with other cancer charities such as Leukaemia Busters, where between 1994 and 2005 Gary and Michelle were the charity's patrons. He has also been involved with the Fight for Life and Cancer Research UK charities.

Lineker was made a freeman of the City of Leicester in 1995 and he has been referred to as "Leicester's favourite son".

In October 2002, Lineker backed a £5 million bid to rescue his former club Leicester City, which had recently gone into administration, describing his involvement as "charity" rather than an "ego trip". He stated that he would invest a six-figure sum and that other members of his consortium would invest a similar amount. Lineker met with fans' groups to persuade them to try and raise money to rescue his former club. The club was eventually saved from liquidation. He is now honorary Vice President of Leicester City F.C.

Lineker married Danielle Bux on 2 September 2009, in Ravello, Italy.  On 13 January 2016, Lineker and Bux announced they were divorcing, after six years of marriage, the reason given being Gary not wanting more children.

In 1985, Lineker was best man at snooker player Willie Thorne's wedding and their close friendship was the subject of the VHS production, Best of Friends – The Official Story of Gary Lineker & Willie Thorne.

In November 2017, Lineker was named in the Paradise Papers in connection with a tax avoidance scheme relating to property owned in Barbados and a company set up in the British Virgin Islands.

Lineker speaks Spanish, which he learnt during his time playing for FC Barcelona, and is an advocate for the teaching of foreign languages in schools.

In April 2020, during the COVID-19 pandemic, Lineker announced that he was donating £140,000 to the British Red Cross towards research into the virus.

Political views
Lineker has been noted for political views which he shares on Twitter. In December 2016, he was described by Angus Harrison of Vice News as "the British Left's Loudest Voice" for being "both staunchly liberal and resolutely unafraid of making his views known". Using a football analogy, Lineker defined his ideological position as "I make more runs to the left than the right, but never felt comfortable on the wing". After the 2017 United Kingdom general election, in which Theresa May led the Conservatives and Jeremy Corbyn led Labour, Lineker wrote "Anyone else feel politically homeless? Everything seems far right or way left. Something sensibly centrist might appeal?"

Lineker endorsed a Remain vote in the 2016 United Kingdom European Union membership referendum. In July 2018, he announced his support for People's Vote, a campaign group calling for a public vote on the final Brexit deal between the UK and the European Union.

On 18 October 2016, Lineker tweeted a rebuttal to a statement made by MP David Davies where Davies suggested refugees entering the UK should undergo dental checks to verify their age: "The treatment by some towards these young refugees is hideously racist and utterly heartless. What's happening to our country?" This led The Sun to call for Lineker's sacking from Match of the Day, accusing him of breaching BBC impartiality guidelines. 

In December 2018, Lineker was criticised by the BBC's cricket correspondent Jonathan Agnew for expressing his political views on Twitter. Agnew said, "You are the face of BBC Sport. Please observe BBC editorial guidelines and keep your political views, whatever they are and whatever the subject, to yourself. I'd be sacked if I followed your example." A BBC spokesperson said, "Gary is not involved in any news or political output for the BBC and as such, any expression of his personal political views does not affect the BBC's impartiality."

In October 2022, a complaint about a tweet from Lineker that referred to donations to the Conservative Party was upheld by the BBC, on the grounds that it breached social media use guidelines and failed to meet editorial standards of impartiality. During the 2022 World Cup, Qatari lawyer Hassan Al-Thawadi criticised Lineker for covering human rights violations in Qatar by stating that he did not talk about such issues with other host countries. In response, Lineker countered on the The News Agents podcast that he covered issues in other host countries, and characterised the United States, which is hosting the 2026 FIFA World Cup, as an "extraordinarily racist country". His statements on the United States were criticised by Culture Secretary Michelle Donelan in January 2023, who stated that "I'm thinking their most recent one was when he [Lineker] was over in Qatar, and he did an interview… and he referenced America and there were some very derogatory questionable comments."

2023 controversy and suspension from Match of the Day 

In March 2023, Lineker criticised the British government's asylum policy via Twitter. Commenting on a video message by Home Secretary Suella Braverman about stopping migrants crossing the English Channel in small boats, he said the message was "beyond awful" and called the government's policy "an immeasurably cruel policy directed at the most vulnerable people in language that is not dissimilar to that used by Germany in the 30s". The comments received condemnation from some Conservative politicians, including Braverman herself, and a spokesperson for Keir Starmer, the Labour Party leader, said comparisons with 1930s Germany "aren't always the best way" to make an argument. Lineker received support from other political figures, including Baron Dubs, Alastair Campbell, and Angela Rayner. A BBC source said the corporation was taking the matter "seriously" and expected to have a "frank conversation" with Lineker. The BBC's culture and media editor Katie Razzall wrote, "As the UK's most scrutinised media organisation in increasingly polarised times, to say Gary Lineker's recent tweets cause difficulty for the BBC is an understatement." Lineker said he stood by his comments and did not fear suspension from his BBC work. 

On 10 March, the BBC said Lineker would step back from his job on Match of the Day because it considered "his recent social media activity to be a breach of our guidelines". It added it had "decided Lineker will not present Match of the Day until there's an agreed and clear position on his use of social media". Lineker's BBC Sport colleagues Ian Wright, Alan Shearer, Steve Wilson, Conor McNamara, Robyn Cowen, Steven Wyeth, Alex Scott, Jason Mohammad, Mark Chapman, Jermaine Jenas, Dion Dublin and Jermain Defoe all pulled out of their respective roles in BBC programmes in the next hours in solidarity with him. As a result, the broadcaster was forced to reduce its sports-related schedules for 11 and 12 March, with Match of the Day going ahead without any hosts or studio presentation, thus featuring only match footage. It also affected the BBC World Service's English-language programme Sportsworld, which was not aired on that day and was instead replaced with alternative programming. The BBC and Lineker issued coordinated statements on 13 March. Lineker's suspension was ended and the BBC announced it would initiate an independent review of its social media guidelines and how they apply to freelancers outside news. Director-General Tim Davie stated that Lineker had agreed to abide by the corporation's editorial guidelines until the review into them has been completed.

Career statistics

Club

International

Lineker earned his first cap for England in 1984 against Scotland during the 1983–84 British Home Championship. He played his last game for England in a 2–1 loss against Sweden in a Euro 1992 group stage match. He almost equalled the England goalscoring record, held at the time by Bobby Charlton, in a pre-tournament friendly against Brazil, but he missed a penalty kick, leaving him one goal short of Charlton's total, which was overtaken by Wayne Rooney in 2015.

Scores and results list England's goal tally first, score column indicates score after each Lineker goal.

Honours
Leicester City
 Football League Second Division: 1979–80

Everton
 FA Charity Shield: 1985

Barcelona

 European Cup Winners' Cup: 1988–89
 Copa del Rey: 1987–88

Tottenham Hotspur
 FA Cup: 1990–91
 FA Charity Shield: 1991 (shared)

England
 FIFA World Cup fourth place: 1990

Individual
 English Football Hall of Fame: 2003
 PFA Team of the Century (1977–1996): 2007
 PFA Players' Player of the Year: 1985–86
 FWA Footballer of the Year: 1985–86, 1991–92
 PFA Team of the Year: 1989–90 First Division, 1991–92 First Division
 English First Division top scorer: 1984–85, 1985–86, 1989–90
 English Second Division top scorer: 1982–83
 Ballon d'Or runner-up: 1986
 FIFA 100
 FIFA World Cup Golden Boot: 1986
 FIFA World Cup All-Star Team: 1986
 Onze de Bronze: 1986
 FIFA World Player of the Year bronze award: 1991
 FIFA Fair Play Award: 1990
 FWA Tribute Award: 1997

Fellowships 
Lineker is a Visiting Fellow of Lady Margaret Hall, University of Oxford, appointed 2020.

References

Further reading

External links

 
 
 
 
 Lineker's first goal in Jleague – J.League official

1960 births
Living people
1986 FIFA World Cup players
1990 FIFA World Cup players
Association football forwards
BBC sports presenters and reporters
BT Sport presenters and reporters
England B international footballers
England international footballers
English association football commentators
English expatriate footballers
English expatriate sportspeople in Japan
English expatriate sportspeople in Spain
English Football Hall of Fame inductees
English Football League players
English footballers
English television presenters
Everton F.C. players
Expatriate footballers in Japan
Expatriate footballers in Spain
FA Cup Final players
FC Barcelona players
FIFA 100
First Division/Premier League top scorers
Footballers from Leicester
Golf writers and broadcasters
J1 League players
La Liga players
Leicester City F.C. players
Nagoya Grampus players
Officers of the Order of the British Empire
People educated at City of Leicester Boys' Grammar School
People named in the Paradise Papers
Television personalities from Leicestershire
Tottenham Hotspur F.C. players
UEFA Euro 1988 players
UEFA Euro 1992 players